Ben Anderson (born )  is a British journalist, television reporter, and writer. A recipient of the Foreign Press Award, he was born in Middlesbrough, educated at Bedford Modern School and now lives in Brooklyn, New York.

Biography
In 2005, Anderson reported for Frontline Football – four films for the BBC that followed national football teams beset by turmoil during the qualifying rounds of the World Cup. In the previous year, he was a reporter on Holidays in the Danger Zone - The Violent Coast. This four-part series for BBC2 focused on travelling along West Africa's notoriously dangerous coast. Back in 2003, Anderson was a reporter on Correspondent - Terror in South East Asia, which profiled Khalid Sheikh Mohammed's time in Manila with Ramsi Yousef, prior to the September 11 attacks.

Anderson is known for Holidays in the Axis of Evil, the BBC series in which he travelled secretly to Iran, Iraq, North Korea, Syria, Libya and Cuba. He also made films about gang wars in El Salvador, the landless movement in Brazil, pollution in Varanasi, gorilla poaching in Congo, homosexuals in America, Maoist insurgents in Bihar, water rights for Palestinians in the West Bank, the third generation of Agent Orange victims in Vietnam, deportees and pimps in Cambodia and the war in Southern Iraq. Ben is also the presenter of World's Toughest Tribes – a six-part television documentary series for Discovery Channel that focuses on unique modern-day tribes.

His recent work includes "Taking on the Taliban", a harrowing film that resulted from two months in Helmand, Afghanistan's most violent province, with the Queen's Company, Grenadier Guards. The film was shortlisted for RTS programme and Journalism awards, as well as a BAFTA. His diary from Helmand, ''No Worse Enemy: The Inside Story of the Chaotic Struggle for Afghanistan, was published by the London Review of Books in 2012. Sherard Cowper-Coles, former British Ambassador to Afghanistan, praised the book as, "The truth about the Afghan war, from a brave and exceptionally honest reporter... Essential reading for anyone who wants to know what is really going on in Helmand."

Anderson has since covered slave labour in Dubai, and new threats and solutions to deforestation for BBC 1's Panorama. He has been back to Helmand several times, for Newsnight, The Times, the Guardian magazine, GQ and VBS (where Spike Jonze singled out his film "Obama's War" as amongst the best of 2009.) In 2010 he wrote, filmed and produced The Battle for Marjah for HBO/Channel Four and in 2011 he made The Battle for Bomb Alley for BBC1, which followed US Marines as they struggled to reclaim the district of Sangin in Afghanistan. He won a Frontline Club Award and a Beyaux-Calvados award for his work with the pieces Mission Accomplished? The Secret of Helmand and This Is What Winning Looks Like, a feature-length documentary he produced with VICE Media that focuses on the problems arising from the American and British troops' withdrawal from Afghanistan.

Vice Media 
In 2013, Anderson joined HBO's Vice as an on-air correspondent and producer, going on to be nominated for an Emmy Award in the category of Outstanding Informational Series or Special as a senior producer of Vice in 2015.

He has worked with World Champion Boxer David Haye on a film.

Filmography

Writings

References

Further reading
 Gibbons-Neff and Ben Anderson. "A Hunt for a Deadly Sniper From Two Perspectives." The New York Times. June 4, 2013.

British sportswriters
Living people
1970s births
Year of birth uncertain
People educated at Bedford Modern School